August "Ago" Neo (12 February 1908 – 19 August 1982) was an Estonian wrestler who won two medals at the 1936 Summer Olympics: a silver medal in the freestyle wrestling and a bronze in Greco-Roman wrestling. His achievements were underscored by teammate Kristjan Palusalu, who won two gold medals in wrestling at the same games. Neo also won five medals in both wrestling styles at the European championships in 1934–1939.

Neo took up wrestling in 1928 and in 1931 placed fourth at European championships. He missed the 1932 Olympics because Estonia did not send an ample team to Los Angeles due to the Great Depression. During World War II he retired from wrestling and emigrated to Sweden. There he founded a small transport company and worked as a truck driver. He died in 1982 in Denmark, on the way from Germany to Sweden. Neo was first buried at Stockholm, but in 1998 reburied at the Metsakalmistu cemetery in Tallinn, Estonia.

References

External links
 
 
 
 
 

1908 births
1982 deaths
People from Lääne-Harju Parish
People from Kreis Harrien
Olympic wrestlers of Estonia
Wrestlers at the 1936 Summer Olympics
Estonian male sport wrestlers
Olympic silver medalists for Estonia
Olympic bronze medalists for Estonia
Olympic medalists in wrestling
Medalists at the 1936 Summer Olympics
European Wrestling Championships medalists
Estonian World War II refugees
Estonian emigrants to Sweden
Burials at Metsakalmistu
20th-century Estonian people